Orazio Schillaci (born  27 April 1966) is an Italian politician who has been Minister of Health in the Meloni government since October 2022.

In 1990 he graduated in medicine and surgery at Sapienza University, where he then obtained in 1994 the specialization in nuclear medicine; until 2001 he was a researcher at the University of L'Aquila. In 2001 he moved to the University of Rome Tor Vergata as associate professor of nuclear medicine. From 2007 he became full professor, and in 2008 director of the school of specialization in nuclear medicine. In the three-year period 2006-2009 he was an expert member of the Superior Health Council. From 2011 to 2019 he was vice president and then president of the faculty of medicine and surgery of the University of Rome Tor Vergata and in 2019 he was elected rector of the same university.

References

External links
 

1966 births
Living people
21st-century Italian politicians
Italian Ministers of Health